Hypericum hartwegii is a species of flowering plant, a shrub in the St. John's wort family Hypericaceae. It is endemic to Ecuador. It was collected twice in 1841 in Loja Province, and it has not been seen since.

References

hartwegii
Endemic flora of Ecuador
Taxonomy articles created by Polbot
Plants described in 1843